Billboard Top Rock'n'Roll Hits: 1966 is a compilation album released by Rhino Records in 1989, featuring 10 hit recordings from 1966.

All ten songs on the original 1989 release reached number one on the Billboard Hot 100 chart.  However a 1993 re-issue replaced the two Motown songs ("You Can't Hurry Love" & "Reach Out I'll Be There") as well as Nancy Sinatra's "These Boots are Made for Walkin'" with "When a Man Loves a Woman," "Devil with a Blue Dress On/Good Golly Miss Molly," and "Good Lovin'," subsequently bringing the number of chart toppers down from ten to nine.

Absent from the track lineup were songs by The Beatles and The Rolling Stones. A disclaimer on the back of the album stated that licensing restrictions made tracks from the two bands unavailable for inclusion on the album.

The album was certified Gold by the RIAA on April 2, 1997.

Track listing

1989 original release

1993 re-release, replacement tracks

References

1989 compilation albums
Billboard Top Rock'n'Roll Hits albums
Pop rock compilation albums